This is a list of diplomatic missions in Qatar. The capital, Doha, hosts 112 embassies. Several other countries are accredited to Qatar from other capitals.

Diplomatic missions in Doha

Embassies

Other missions or delegations
 (Delegation)
 (Representative Office)

Gallery

Former embassies

Accredited embassies 
Resident in Riyadh unless otherwise noted

 (Kuwait City)
 (Kuwait City)

 (Abu Dhabi)
 (Abu Dhabi)
 (Cairo)
 (Abu Dhabi)
 (Abu Dhabi)

 (London)
 (Kuwait City)
 (Kuwait City)
 (Cairo)
 (Kuwait City)
 (Islamabad)
 (Kuwait City)
 (Abu Dhabi)
 (Kuwait City)
 (Abu Dhabi)
 (Madrid)
 (Abu Dhabi)
 (Kuwait City)
 (Cairo)
 (Kuwait City)

 (Kuwait City)

 (Kuwait City)

See also 
 Foreign relations of Qatar
 Visa requirements for Qatari citizens

References

External links 
 Ministry of Foreign Affairs of Qatar

Diplomatic missions
Qatar